Franz Martin Chales de Beaulieu (11 November 1857 – 27 April 1945) was a German general in World War I. He was also involved in the Herero Wars as chief of staff to Lothar von Trotha.

Life 
Franz Martin Chales de Beaulieu was born as son of Eduard Chales de Beaulieu on 11 November 1857.

In 1877, Beaulieu entered the Prussian Army as a Fahnenjunker in the 2nd Guards Grenadier Regiment. On 12 October 1877, Beaulieu was appointed as Second-Lieutenant. In 1887, Beaulieu was promoted to Premier-Lieutenant. In 1891, Beaulieu became the adjutant of Alfred von Schlieffen, the Chief of the German General Staff. In 1894, Beaulieu was again with the 2nd Guards Grenadier Regiment in Berlin. He then served in the staff of the 2nd Guards Division before becoming a major on 18 November 1897; then serving on the staff of the VI Corps. In 1901, he was once more with the 2nd Guards Grenadier Regiment and in 1902, Beaulieu again became an adjutant of Alfred von Schlieffen. In 1903, Beaulieu served as a section chief in the general staff and, on 24 April 1904, he was promoted to Oberstleutnant. After his promotion, Beaulieu became part of the Schutztruppe and became chief of staff to General Lothar von Trotha during the Herero Wars. Afterwards Beaulieu returned to Germany and became chief of staff of the II Corps. On 16 October 1905, Beaulieu became the commander of the 32nd Infantry Regiment. He was promoted to Oberst in 1907 and Generalmajor in 1911. He became the commander of 74th Infantry Brigade. On 25 June 1913, Beaulieu became a Generalleutnant and commander of the 12th Division.

At the outbreak of the World War I, Beaulieu's 12th Division was part of the 4th Army under Albrecht, Duke of Württemberg. The division accordingly served on the Western Front nd participated in the Battle of the Ardennes. In 1916 the Oberste Heeresleitung named Beaulieu commander of the XIV Corps, replacing Karl von Hänisch. On 5 September 1917, Beaulieu received the Pour le Mérite from Wilhelm II for his actions in the war. On the same day Beaulieu was removed from his position and retired. Shortly after his retirement, on 3 January 1918, Beaulieu was given the character of a General der Infantrie.

Awards

German Awards 

 Iron Cross (1914) First and Second Class
 Pour le Mérite, 5 September 1917
 Order of the Red Eagle 2nd Class
 Service award

 Military Merit Order 3rd Class with Swords

 Albert Order Officer's Cross
   Ernestine duchies
 Commander of Order of the White Falcon
 Commander of 1st Class of the Saxe-Ernestine House Order

 Cross of Honor of Order of the Crown with Swords
 Knight's Cross 1st Class Friedrich Order

Foreign Awards 
 
 Officer Cross of Order of Saints Maurice and Lazarus
 Officer Cross of Order of the Crown of Italy
 
 Knight's Cross of Order of Leopold (Austria)
 Order of the Iron Crown (Austria) 3rd Class
 Knight's Cross of Order of Franz Joseph
 
 Commander of Order of the Crown (Romania)

References 

1857 births
1945 deaths
People from the Province of Prussia
German untitled nobility
Generals of Infantry (Prussia)
German Army generals of World War I
Recipients of the Iron Cross (1914), 2nd class
Recipients of the Iron Cross (1914), 1st class
Schutztruppe personnel
People of the Herero and Namaqua genocide
Colonial people in German South West Africa
Recipients of the Pour le Mérite (military class)
Military personnel from Brandenburg